Jordan David Díaz (born August 13, 2000) is a Colombian professional baseball third baseman for the Oakland Athletics of Major League Baseball (MLB). He made his MLB debut in 2022.

Career
Díaz signed with the Oakland Athletics as an international free agent in August 2016. As of 2021, in the minor leagues he had played 205 games at third base, 24 at first base, 12 at DH, 4 in left field, and one each at second base and catcher, and had a career slash line of .271/.324/.417. The Athletics added him to their 40-man roster after the 2021 season. He made his major league debut on September 18, 2022.

Díaz was optioned to the Triple-A Las Vegas Aviators to begin the 2023 season.

International career
Díaz is on Colombia national baseball team for the 2023 World Baseball Classic.

References

External links

2000 births
Living people
Arizona League Athletics players
Colombian expatriate baseball players in the Dominican Republic
Colombian expatriate baseball players in the United States
Dominican Summer League Athletics players
Lansing Lugnuts players
Las Vegas Aviators players
Major League Baseball players from Colombia
Major League Baseball third basemen
Midland RockHounds players
Oakland Athletics players
Vermont Lake Monsters players
2023 World Baseball Classic players